Leptospermeae is a tribe in the plant family Myrtaceae from south-east Asia and Oceania with a main diversity center in Australia.

Genera
Agonis (Australia)
Asteromyrtus (Australia)
Homalospermum (Australia)
Kunzea (Australia, New Zealand)
Leptospermum
Neofabricia (Australia)
Paragonis ((Australia)
Pericalymma ((Australia)
Taxandria (Australia)

References

Rosid tribes
Myrtaceae